Allan Egeland (born January 31, 1973) is a Canadian former professional ice hockey centre.  He was drafted in the third round, 55th overall, by the Tampa Bay Lightning in the 1993 NHL Entry Draft. Egeland was born in Lethbridge, Alberta.

Playing career

Egeland played 17 games in the National Hockey League, all with the Lightning, scoring no points. Allan Egeland also played with the Orlando Solar Bears during the 1998-99 season. He was a strong fighter for the team.

After his playing career, Egeland became an assistant coach with the Charlotte Checkers of the ECHL.

Personal life

Egeland met his wife, Holly, in 1995.  They were married in 2001.  The couple has two children.

Career statistics

Regular season and playoffs

Awards
 WHL West First All-Star Team – 1993
 WHL West Second All-Star Team – 1994

External links

1973 births
Adirondack Red Wings players
Atlanta Knights players
Canadian ice hockey centres
Charlotte Checkers (1993–2010) players
Cincinnati Cyclones (ECHL) players
Cleveland Lumberjacks players
Sportspeople from Lethbridge
Lethbridge Hurricanes players
Living people
Long Beach Ice Dogs (IHL) players
Orlando Solar Bears (IHL) players
Pensacola Ice Pilots players
Saint John Flames players
Tacoma Rockets players
Tampa Bay Lightning draft picks
Tampa Bay Lightning players
Ice hockey people from Alberta
20th-century Canadian people
21st-century Canadian people